Meyer Levin (October 7, 1905 – July 9, 1981) was an American novelist. Perhaps best known for his work on the Leopold and Loeb case, Levin worked as a journalist (for the Chicago Daily News and, from 1933–1939, as an editor for Esquire).

Career
Levin was born in Chicago. He published six novels before World War II. Though critical response was good, none were successful financially. Reporter (1929) was a novel of the modern newspapers, Frankie and Johnny (1930) an urban romance, Yehuda (1931) takes place on a kibbutz, and The New Bridge (1933) dealt with unemployed construction workers at the beginning of the Depression. In 1937, Levin published The Old Bunch, a story of immigrant Chicago Jewry that James T. Farrell called "one of the most serious and ambitious novels yet produced by the current generation of American novelists." Citizens (1940) was a fictional account of the 1937 strike at the Republic Steel Company plant outside Chicago.

He also wrote and directed a documentary titled "The Illegals," for the Office Of War. The film dealt with the smuggling of Jews out of Poland.

Levin was a war correspondent in Europe during World War II, representing the Overseas News Agency and the Jewish Telegraphic Agency.

After the war, Levin wrote, with the approval of the Frank family, a play based on The Diary of Anne Frank, but his play was not produced. Instead a version of the same story dramatized by Frances Goodrich and Albert Hackett reached Broadway. Levin sued for plagiarism.

Meyer wrote the 1956 novel Compulsion, inspired by the Leopold and Loeb case. The novel, for which Levin was given a Special Edgar Award by the Mystery Writers of America in 1957, was the basis for Levin's own 1957 play adaptation and the 1959 film based on it, starring Orson Welles. Compulsion was "the first 'documentary' or 'non-fiction novel' ("a style later used in Truman Capote's In Cold Blood and Norman Mailer's The Executioner's Song").

Levin died in Jerusalem.

Bibliography

Novels
The Reporter (1929)
Frankie and Johnny (1930)
Yehuda (1931)
The Golden Mountain: Marvelous Tales of Rabbi Israel Baal Shem and of his Great-Grandson, Rabbi Nachman, Retold from Hebrew, Yiddish and German Sources (1932)
The New Bridge (1933)
The Old Bunch (1937)
Citizens (1940)
My Father's House (1947)
Compulsion (1956)
Eva (1959)
The Fanatic (1964)
The Stronghold (1965)
Gore and Igor (1968)
The Settlers (1972)
The Spell of Time (1974)
The Harvest (1978)
The Architect (1981), (fictionalized life of Frank Lloyd Wright)
"Classic Chassidic Tales" (1932), a gathering of the scattered legends of Baal Shem Tov

Autobiographical works
In Search (1949)
The Obsession (1974)

Judaica
Beginnings in Jewish Philosophy
The Story of Israel
An Israel Haggadah for Passover
The Story of the Synagogue
The Story of the Jewish Way of Life
Hassidic Stories"

 Awards 

 1966: National Jewish Book Award for The Stronghold
1967: National Jewish Book Award for The Story of Israel''

See also
Gabriel Levin, his son
Tereska Torres, his wife

References

External links

An article about The Illegals

1905 births
1981 deaths
20th-century American novelists
American crime fiction writers
American male journalists
20th-century American journalists
American religious writers
Edgar Award winners
University of Chicago alumni
Writers from Chicago
Jewish American novelists
American male novelists
20th-century American male writers
Novelists from Illinois
20th-century American non-fiction writers
20th-century American Jews